An award pin is a small object, usually made from metal or plastic, with a pin on the back, presented as an award of achievement or a mark of appreciation. They are worn on clothes such as jackets, shirts or hats.

Award pins usually have an image or words, or both, depicting the reason for the award. 

An award pin series that is offered by the U.S. Government to all eligible civilians is the Pilot Proficiency Award Program.
Award pins are commonly given to participants of youth sports as a method to reinforce excellent play and sportsmanship. There are many companies that provide Sports Award Pins. 

Award pins can usually be plated on Gold (plain or antique), Silver (plain or antique), Nickel and Black Nickel or Copper (plain or antique).

During the manufacturing process pins can be filled with enamel colors and then covered with a thin coat of epoxy to protect these colors.

See also
Lapel pin

Award items
Memorabilia
Badges